In cost accounting, target income sales are the sales necessary to achieve a given target income (or targeted income). It can be measured either in units or in currency (sales proceeds), and can be computed using contribution margin similarly to break-even point:

See also
 Break-even
 Cost–volume–profit analysis

Management accounting